Crinipus leucozonipus is a moth of the family Sesiidae. It is known from Yemen.

References

Sesiidae
Invertebrates of the Arabian Peninsula
Moths described in 1896